Hamilton City Council is the governing body of the City of Hamilton, Ontario, Canada. Since 21 November 1960, Council has met at Hamilton City Hall at 71 Main Street West.

The current council consists of the mayor plus fifteen councillors, one elected from each of the city's wards. The incumbent council was elected in a Hamilton municipal election on October 24, 2022.

Council members

Hamilton City Councils Post Amalgamation (2000–present)

Hamilton City Councils Post Board of Control (1980–2000)

Hamilton City Councils and Boards of Control (1910–1980)

References

External links
Hamilton, Ontario City Council
Citizens at City Hall watchdog group

Municipal councils in Ontario
Municipal government of Hamilton, Ontario